The 1991–92 UTEP Miners men's basketball team represented the University of Texas at El Paso in the 1991–92 college basketball season. The team was led by head coach Don Haskins. The Miners finished 27–7 (12–4 in WAC), reached the finals of the WAC tournament, and gained an at-large bid to the NCAA tournament as the No. 9 seed in the Midwest region. After defeating Evansville in the opening round, UTEP beat top-seeded Kansas to reach the Sweet Sixteen. The run ended there, as the Miners lost by two points to Cincinnati in the regional semifinal.

Roster

Schedule and results

|-
!colspan=9 style=| Regular season

|-
!colspan=9 style=| WAC tournament

|-
!colspan=9 style=| NCAA tournament

Rankings

NBA draft

References

UTEP Miners men's basketball seasons
Utep
Utep
UTEP Miners men's basket
UTEP Miners men's basket